Sayeeda Khatun is an Indian politician. She was a Member of Parliament, representing Madhya Pradesh in the Rajya Sabha the upper house of India's Parliament as a member of the Indian National Congress.

References

Rajya Sabha members from Madhya Pradesh
Indian National Congress politicians from Madhya Pradesh
Women in Madhya Pradesh politics
1944 births
Living people
Women members of the Rajya Sabha